The 1965 International cricket season was held between May 1965 and August 1965.

Season overview

May

New Zealand in England

July

South Africa in England

References

1965 in cricket